Too Late For Living is the third album from the Christian metal band Saint.

Track listing 

"Too Late for Living" - 3:57
"Star Pilot" - 3:29 
"Accuser" - 2:00
"The Rock" - 2:50
"On The Street" - 3:38 
"Returning" - 4:48  
"The Path" - 3:48
"Through the Sky" - 3:49
"The War is Over" - 3:16

References

Saint (band) albums
1988 albums